Advanced Placement (AP) Economics (also known as AP Econ) refers to two College Board Advanced Placement Program courses and exams addressing various aspects of the field of economics:
AP Macroeconomics
AP Microeconomics

AP Economics
Economics education